The 1990 Internationaux de Strasbourg was a women's tennis tournament played on outdoor clay courts at the  Ligue d'Alsace de Tenis in Strasbourg, France that was part of the Tier IV category of the 1990 WTA Tour. It was the fourth edition of the tournament and was held from 21 May until 27 May 1990. Unseeded Mercedes Paz won the singles title.

Finals

Singles
 Mercedes Paz defeated  Ann Grossman 6–2, 6–3
 It was Paz' 1st title of the year and the 3rd of her career.

Doubles
 Nicole Provis /  Elna Reinach defeated  Kathy Jordan /  Elizabeth Smylie 6–1, 6–4

References

External links
 ITF tournament edition details 
 Tournament draws

Internationaux de Strasbourg
1990
Internationaux de Strasbourg
May 1990 sports events in Europe